The Go Bowling 250 was a NASCAR Xfinity Series stock car race that took place at Richmond Raceway in Richmond, Virginia in the month of September. It is held the night before the NASCAR Cup Series race, the Federated Auto Parts 400. Noah Gragson won the 2021 race which was the last year it was run.

In 2018, as part of schedule realignment, the event became the first race of the NASCAR Xfinity Series playoffs.

In 2020, as part of schedule realignment, this became the only Xfinity Series race at the track as NASCAR decided to give the track one Truck Series race instead. This schedule change was done in a swap with Martinsville Speedway, which previously had two Truck Series races and zero Xfinity Series races and would now have one Truck Series race and one Xfinity Series race (which replaced the spring race at Richmond).

In 2022, the September Xfinity Series race at Richmond was moved to the spring (in exchange for moving the Truck Series race to the summer race weekend) and there was no September race at the track for the first time in the series' history.

Past winners

1987: Race shortened due to rain. Last race on old half-mile layout.
1991: Race moved to a Friday night event.
1996: Race postponed from Friday to Sunday due to power outage.
2005 & 2007: Races extended due to NASCAR overtime.
2008: Race postponed from Friday to Sunday due to rain from Hurricane Hanna.
2013: Marked the 1,000th race held in series.
2014: Kyle Busch led all 250 laps.
2020: Race held as the first race of a doubleheader weekend (the second race replaced the race at Michigan International Speedway due to COVID-19).

Track length 
1982–1987: 0.5-mile oval
1988–present: 0.75-mile D-shaped oval

Multiple winners (drivers)

Multiple winners (teams)

Manufacturer wins

References

External links
 

1982 establishments in Virginia
NASCAR Xfinity Series races
 
Recurring sporting events established in 1982
Annual sporting events in the United States